Oliva hirasei, common name Hirase's olive, is a species of sea snail, a marine gastropod mollusk in the family Olividae, the olives.

Description
The length of the shell varies between 35 mm and 60 mm.

Distribution
This marine species occurs off Japan, Vietnam, the Philippines, Indonesia and New Caledonia.

References

External links
 

hirasei
Gastropods described in 1959